BWW may refer to:
 Balan Wonderworld, a 2021 platform game developed by Arzest and published by Square Enix.
 Britt World Wide, BWW a unit of Amway Global
 Buffalo Wild Wings known as BWW
 Las Brujas Airport (Cuba), IATA airport code for Cayo Santa María, Cuba